Pseudopyrenula is a genus of lichen-forming fungi in the family Trypetheliaceae.

Species
Pseudopyrenula americana  – Guyana
Pseudopyrenula cryptotheca  – Venezuela
Pseudopyrenula cubana 
Pseudopyrenula diluta 
Pseudopyrenula flavoreagens 
Pseudopyrenula flavosuperans  – Bolivia
Pseudopyrenula guianensis  – French Guiana
Pseudopyrenula hexamera  – Venezuela
Pseudopyrenula media 
Pseudopyrenula miniflavida 
Pseudopyrenula serusiauxii  – Papua New Guinea
Pseudopyrenula staphyleae 
Pseudopyrenula thallina  – Costa Rica

References

Trypetheliaceae
Lichen genera
Dothideomycetes genera
Taxa described in 1883
Taxa named by Johannes Müller Argoviensis